Sindiswa Thelmonia Maneli is a South African politician who has been an African National Congress Member of the National Assembly of South Africa since December 2021.

Snce becoming an MP, Maneli has served on the Portfolio Committee on Public Service and Administration and the Portfolio Committee on Tourism.

References

External links
Profile at Parliament of South Africa

Living people
Year of birth missing (living people)
Place of birth missing (living people)
People from the Free State (province)
Members of the National Assembly of South Africa
Women members of the National Assembly of South Africa